The Guajira mouse opossum (Marmosa xerophila) is a species of opossum in the family Didelphidae. It is found in Colombia and Venezuela.

References

Opossums
Marsupials of South America
Mammals of Colombia
Mammals of Venezuela
Mammals described in 1979
Taxonomy articles created by Polbot